Juyom Rural District is a rural district (dehestan) in Juyom District, Larestan County, Fars Province, Iran. At the 2006 census, its population was 4,213, in 890 families.  The rural district has 29 villages.

References 

Rural Districts of Fars Province
Larestan County